Maids of the Mountain Hockey Club was a women's field hockey club based in Rathfarnham, South Dublin, Ireland. The club was founded in 1918 and was originally based in Foxrock. Maids of the Mountain were closely associated with Three Rock Rovers Hockey Club. The club was founded by a group of women, the majority of whom were the wives, widows, partners, sisters or children of Three Rock Rovers players. The clubs also shared grounds and eventually merged in 1999. In 1923 Maids of the Mountain completed a national cup double, winning both the Irish Senior Cup and the Irish Junior Cup.

History

Early years
Maids of the Mountain Hockey Club was founded in 1918. The prime mover in establishing the club was Hilda O'Reilly who subsequently captained the Ireland women's national field hockey team during the 1920s. There are two stories about the origin of the club name. The club was formed by a group of women or Maids, the majority of whom were the wives, widows, partners, sisters and children of Three Rock Rovers players. Many were also members of the Voluntary Aid Detachment. The Mountain in the club name refers to Three Rock Mountain, the same mountain that Three Rock Rovers were named after. A second story claims the club was named after The Maid of the Mountains, the operetta written by Harold Fraser-Simson, which was being performed at the Gaiety Theatre, Dublin in August 1918.

Irish Senior Cup
In 1919–20, after playing just three seasons, Maids of the Mountain won a treble, winning the  Irish Senior Cup, the Leinster Senior Cup and the Leinster Senior League.

Notes

Irish Junior Cup
In 1923 Maids of the Mountain won the Irish Junior Cup for the first time. In 1947 when the club won the cup for a second time, the team was captained by Máirín Lynch, the wife of future Taoiseach, Jack Lynch.

Notes

Merger
In 1988, Maids of the Mountain moved to Grange Road, Rathfarnham, South Dublin where they shared the facilities with Three Rock Rovers. On 25 May 1999, the two clubs merged to become one club.

Home grounds
Maids of the Mountain originally played at the home grounds of Three Rock Rovers in Foxrock. In 1930, after Three Rock Rovers moved to Londonbridge Road, the headquarters of the Irish Hockey Union in Ringsend, the Maids remained in Foxrock. In 1934 they moved to grounds in Templeogue. During the 1985–86 season the  Templeogue grounds were sold to builders for development. The Maids remained homeless until 1988 when they settled at Grange Road, once again sharing a home ground with Three Rock Rovers.

Notable players
 internationals

Others
 Muriel Gahan
 Máirín Lynch: wife of future Taoiseach, Jack Lynch.

Honours
Irish Senior Cup
Winners: 1920, 1923, 1930, 1935: 4 
Runners Up: 1926, 1928, 1929  : 3
Irish Junior Cup
Winners: 1923, 1947, 1975: 3 
Runners Up: 1963, 1969: 2

Further reading
Hilary McDonagh; Órla McKeown (2000). The Lilac Years: A History of Maids of the Mountain Hockey Club from 1918 to 1999.

References

Three Rock Rovers Hockey Club
Sports clubs in South Dublin (county)
1918 establishments in Ireland
1999 disestablishments in Ireland
Field hockey clubs established in 1918
Field hockey clubs disestablished in 1999
Field hockey clubs in County Dublin
Women's field hockey teams in Ireland
Defunct field hockey clubs in Ireland